François-Joseph Gossec (17 January 1734 – 16 February 1829) was a French composer of operas, string quartets, symphonies, and choral works.

Life and work
The son of a small farmer, Gossec was born at the village of Vergnies, then a French exclave in the Austrian Netherlands, now an ancienne commune in the municipality of Froidchapelle, Belgium. Showing an early taste for music, he became a choir-boy in Antwerp. He went to Paris in 1751 and was taken on by the composer Jean-Philippe Rameau. He followed Rameau as the conductor of a private orchestra kept by the fermier général Le Riche de La Poupelinière, a wealthy amateur and patron of music. Gradually he became determined to do something to revive the study of instrumental music in France.

Gossec's own first symphony was performed in 1754, and as conductor to the Prince de Condé's orchestra he produced several operas and other compositions of his own. He imposed his influence on French music with remarkable success. His Requiem premiered in 1760, a ninety-minute piece which made him famous overnight. Years later, in 1778, Mozart visited Gossec during a trip to Paris, and described him in a letter to his father as "a very good friend and a very dry man."

Gossec founded the Concert des Amateurs in 1769 and in 1773 he reorganised the Concert Spirituel together with Simon Le Duc and Pierre Gaviniès. In this concert series he conducted his own symphonies as well as those by his contemporaries, particularly works by Joseph Haydn, whose music had become increasingly popular in Paris, finally even superseding Gossec's symphonic work.

In the 1780s Gossec's symphonic output decreased as he began concentrating on operas. He organized the École de Chant in 1784, together with Etienne Méhul, was conductor of the band of the Garde Nationale of the French Revolution, and was appointed (with Méhul and Luigi Cherubini) inspector of the Conservatoire de Musique at its creation in 1795. He was an original member of the Institut and a chevalier of the Legion of Honour. In 1803, he met Napoleon whom admired Gossec very much and asked him if he wanted to work under him which Gossec refused. In  1815, after the defeat of his friend Napoleon at Waterloo, the Conservatoire was closed for some time by Louis XVIII, and the eighty-one-year-old Gossec had to retire. Until 1817 he worked on his last compositions, including a third Te Deum, and was supported by a pension granted by the Conservatoire.

He died in the Parisian suburb of Passy. The funeral service was attended by former colleagues, including Cherubini, at Père Lachaise Cemetery in Paris. His grave is near those of Méhul and Grétry.

Some of his techniques anticipated the innovations of the Romantic era: he scored his Te Deum for 1200 singers and 300 wind instruments, and several oratorios require the physical separation of multiple choirs, including invisible ones behind the stage. He wrote several works in honor of the French revolution, including Le Triomphe de la République, and L'Offrande à la Liberté.

Gossec's Gavotte, from his opera Rosine, ou L'épouse abandonnée (1786),   remains familiar in popular culture because Carl Stalling and Charles M. Jones used arrangements of it in several Warner Brothers cartoons. Arguably the most notable of these is Porky Pig’s dance to an uncredited version of Gossec’s Gavotte in Jones’ ‘’Porky’s Cafe’’ (1942).

Gossec was little known outside France, and his own numerous compositions, sacred and secular, were overshadowed by those of more famous composers; but he was an inspiration to many, and powerfully stimulated the revival of instrumental music.

Works

Symphonies 
 Sei sinfonie a più strumenti op. 4 (1759)
 Sei sinfonie a più strumenti op. 5 (1761)
 Six symphonies op. 6 (1762)
 Six symphonies à grand orchestre op. 12 (1769)
 Deux symphonies (1773)
 Symphonie  (c. 1771-1774)
 Symphonie  (c. 1771-1774)
 Symphonie en fa majeur (1774)
 Symphonie de chasse (1776)
 Symphonie en ré (1776)
 Symphonie en ré (1777)
 Symphonie concertante en fa majeur , à plusieurs instruments (1778)
 Symphonie en do majeur for wind orchestra (1794)
 Symphonie à 17 parties de Gossec|Symphonie à 17 parties en fa majeur (1809)

Chamber music
Sei sonate a due violini e basso, Op. 1 (c. 1753)
Sei quartetti per flauto e violino o sia per due violini, alto e basso, Op. 14 (1769)
Six quatuors à deux violons, alto et basse, Op. 15 (1772)

Vocal and choral works
Messe des morts (Requiem) (1760)
La Nativité, oratorio (1774)
Te Deum (1779)
Te Deum à la Fête de la Fédération for three voices, men's chorus and wind orchestra (1790)
Hymne sur la translation du corps de Voltaire au Panthéon for three voices, men's chorus and wind orchestra (1791)
Le Chant du 14 juillet (Marie-Joseph Chénier) for three voices, men's chorus and wind orchestra (1791)
Dernière messe des vivants, for four voices, chorus and orchestra (1813)

Operas
Le tonnelier, opéra comique (1765)
Le faux Lord, opéra comique (1765)
Les pêcheurs, opéra comique en 1 act (1766)
Toinon et Toinette, opéra comique (1767)
Le double déguisement, opéra comique (1767)
Les agréments d'Hylas et Sylvie, pastorale (1768)
Sabinus, tragédie lyrique (1773)
Berthe, opera (1775, not extant)
Alexis et Daphné, pastorale (1775)
Philémon et Baucis, pastorale (1775)
La fête de village, intermezzo (1778)
Thésée, tragédie lyrique (1782)
Nitocris, opera (1783)
Rosine, ou L'épouse abandonnée, opera (1786)
Le triomphe de la République, ou Le camp de Grandpré, divertissement-lyrique en 1 acte, (Chénier) (1794) – includes a famous Tambourin.
Les sabots et le cerisier, opera (1803)

Notes

References
Thibaut, W., François Joseph Gossec, Chantre de la Révolution française, (1970)

External links
Life and detailed work list 
François-Joseph Gossec: "Le Tyrtée de la Révolution" – the official composer of the French Revolution

1734 births
1829 deaths
19th-century Belgian male musicians
Belgian classical composers
Belgian male classical composers
Belgian opera composers
Burials at Père Lachaise Cemetery
Classical-period composers
Chevaliers of the Légion d'honneur
Directors of the Conservatoire de Paris
Directors of the Paris Opera
Male opera composers
String quartet composers
Walloon people